Karimala Gopuram (കരിമല ഗോപുരം) is the highest peak in the Thrissur district of Kerala. It is located at southern boundary of Parambikulam  Wildlife Sanctuary. It lies in the border of Chalakudy taluk of Thrissur district and Chittur taluk of Palakkad district  of Kerala. It is about 1,439m above sea level in the Western Ghats.

Mountains of Kerala
Geography of Thrissur district